Narromine County is one of the 141 Cadastral divisions of New South Wales. It is located between the Bogan River on the west and the Macquarie River on the east, in the area around Narromine.

Narromine is believed to be derived from a local Aboriginal word.

Parishes within this county
A full list of parishes found within this county; their current LGA and mapping coordinates to the approximate centre of each location is as follows:

References

Counties of New South Wales